The following nicknames are given to a unit (defensive, offensive and special teams) or a secondary nickname given to some teams used to describe a style of play or attitude of teams at times in accordance with phrases in popular culture of the time. They are not the official franchise nicknames of the National Football League (NFL). Since the NFL's inception in 1920, players, coaches, team executives, league officials, and football games have been given nicknames based on either individual achievements, team achievements, historical events, etc.

Teams and units 
Nicknames for entire teams, whole offensive units, defensive units or special teams.
Names which are marked by an asterisk (*) are team nicknames which may have been coined by team members or local media, but never became well known to the public outside of the teams media market for a multitude of reasons, but most likely due to poor performance. The nickname was earned for accomplishments on the field.
 Ain'ts: Nickname given to the New Orleans Saints after their 1980 season of 14 consecutive losses. The name persisted somewhat as, although they would later qualify for the playoffs several times since then, they did not win a playoff game until their defeat of the defending Super Bowl champion Rams in the Wild Card round of the 2000–01 playoffs.
Air Coryell: 1980's San Diego Chargers offense coached by Don Coryell featuring Dan Fouts, Wes Chandler, Charlie Joiner, John Jefferson, and Kellen Winslow.
America's Team: Nickname given to the Dallas Cowboys for having a large number of fans outside its immediate local area. (The term itself is likely derived from the title of the team's 1978 highlight film.)
The Bickering Bills: The 1989 Buffalo Bills, so-called due to internal conflict within the organization between quarterback Jim Kelly and several veteran players as well as a fistfight that occurred between two assistant coaches. 
 Big Blue: An abridged version of the New York Giants nickname Big Blue Wrecking Crew
Big Blue Wrecking Crew: Name of the New York Giants defensive team from 1986 to 1990.
 Bills West: The 2001 San Diego Chargers, so named because of the signing of the Buffalo Bills' former general manager, John Butler, along with several Buffalo Bills players, including quarterback Doug Flutie.
 Blitzburgh: Name of the Pittsburgh Steelers defensive unit since the mid-1990s and their tendency to relentlessly attack opposing quarterbacks.
 The Blue Wave: Name of the Seattle Seahawks teams of the 1980s which included Hall of Famers Steve Largent and Kenny Easley. Quarterbacked by Dave Krieg and coached by Chuck Knox. Fans of the team would perform the wave every game.
The Boogeymen: 2019 New England Patriots linebacker corps, specifically Dont'a Hightower, Jamie Collins Sr., and Kyle Van Noy.
The Border Patrol: 1994 San Diego Chargers Defensive unit featuring Junior Seau, Dennis Gibson, Leslie O'Neal, and Rodney Harrison.
 The Boston TE Party: A play on the name of the historical event that occurred locally in the team's state, the Boston Tea Party, it was the 2010 to 2012 New England Patriots tight end corps, featuring Rob Gronkowski and Aaron Hernandez.
The Birds: Nickname for the Philadelphia Eagles
Bruise Brothers: San Diego Chargers defensive line in the 1970s and 1980s.
 Bull Elephant backfield: running backs of the 1950s Rams: Dick Hoerner, Paul "Tank" Younger, and "Deacon" Dan Towler.
 Bulls on Parade: Refers to the Houston Texans defense, starting in the 2011 season  (but is still a nickname for the Texans). After the hiring of Wade Phillips, the defense went from almost last ranked in the NFL to ranked second at the end of the 2011 season, winning the AFC South for the first time and reaching the post-season for the first time in franchise history. The name is taken from the Rage Against the Machine song of the same name.
 Bungles: Name referring to the Cincinnati Bengals teams of the 1990s and 2000s, whose string of losing seasons with records 8–8 or worse spanned 14 consecutive years in addition to numerous draft busts.  Name also used for any failing Cincinnati Bengals team thereafter.
 Cardiac Cardinals (Cards): the St. Louis Cardinals NFC East championship teams of 1974 (10–4) and '75 (11–3).  Noted for their come-from-behind wins under their head coach, Don Coryell. The name was resurrected for the 1998 team that upset Dallas in the wild card game.
Cardiac Cats: nickname originally given to the 2003 Carolina Panthers and later to the Detroit Lions of the 2010s.
 Cardiac Jags: the Jacksonville Jaguars earned this nickname because of making several comeback wins and/or winning nail-biters.
Cheatriots: A nickname given to the New England Patriots due to several allegations of cheating.
Chuck and Duck: The derisive nickname Buddy Ryan gave to the Houston Oilers Run and Shoot strategy.

Crunch Bunch:The 1981–83 New York Giants linebacking corps noted for their hard-hitting play and for generating many quarterback sacks, Taylor in particular. Mario Sestito of Troy, New York is credited with coining the name after a NY Giants newsletter at the time called 'Inside Football' held a contest to name this defensive unit.
 Da Bears: Slang nickname given to the Chicago Bears made popular by the Bill Swerski's Superfans sketches of the early 1990s on Saturday Night Live. Sometimes used to retroactively refer to the 1985 Bears.
 The Deadskins: Given to the Washington Redskins squads under Daniel Snyder ownership for the team's poor performances.
 Deflatriots: Used in reference to Deflategate.

 Department of Defense: the defensive line of the Washington Football Team beginning in the 2020 season consisting of Chase Young, Montez Sweat, Daron Payne, and Jonathan Allen under head coach Ron Rivera. The name alludes to Washington DC housing the headquarters of the United States Department of Defense

 Dirty Birds: The 1998 Atlanta Falcons (but is still a nickname for the Falcons). The name originates from an end zone dance started by Jamal Anderson that was adopted by all the players upon scoring.
 The Dream Team: In the 2011 offseason, the Philadelphia Eagles signed many notable free agents including Nnamdi Asomugha, Jason Babin, Evan Mathis, Dominique Rodgers-Cromartie, and Vince Young. Young declared the Eagles to be a "Dream Team".
Dome Patrol: The linebacker corps, specifically Rickey Jackson, Vaughan Johnson, Sam Mills, and Pat Swilling, of the National Football League's New Orleans Saints during the late 1980s and early 1990s.
Doomsday Defense: The 1970s Dallas Cowboys defensive team.  Doomsday I, the unit that led the Cowboys to victory in Super Bowl VI, was anchored by future Pro Football Hall of Fame members Herb Adderley, Bob Lilly, and Mel Renfro, while Doomsday II, which spearheaded the drive to the title in Super Bowl XII, featured Hall of Famer Randy White and fellow defensive linemen Harvey Martin and Ed "Too Tall" Jones.
 Electric Company: The 1970s Buffalo Bills offensive line. They were given that name because they "turned on the 'Juice'" by paving the way for star halfback O. J. Simpson, who was nicknamed "Juice", because a common nickname for orange juice is also O. J.
 Evil Empire: Name associating the New England Patriots dynasty of the 2000s.  Coach Bill Belichick was deemed "evil" after the Spygate scandal and the term is a play on Belichick's frequent use of hooded sweatshirts on the sideline, making him resemble the Emperor Palpatine character from the Star Wars motion picture series.
Fearsome Foursome: The 1960s Los Angeles Rams defensive line.
The Four Headed Monster: The 2017, 2018, and 2019 New England Patriots running backs.
The Fun Bunch: The Washington Redskins endzone celebrations after touchdowns in the early to mid 1980's. This group's choreographed touchdown celebrations led to a league-wide ban of "excessive celebration" in 1984.
 G Men: Nickname of the New York Giants.
 Gang Green:  Nickname of the New York Jets, or the Philadelphia Eagles defensive team from 1987 to 1990, when the team was coached by Buddy Ryan.
The Ghosts: The 2019 New England Patriots secondary, in reference to Jets quarterback Sam Darnold "seeing ghosts" on Monday Night Football.
The Gravediggers: The 2020 Tampa Bay Buccaneers front seven, which led the league in rushing defense and were 6th in the league in sacks.
The Greatest Show on Turf: The 1999–2001 St. Louis Rams record-breaking offensive team featuring Kurt Warner, Marshall Faulk, Issac Bruce, Torry Holt, Az-Zahir Hakim, and Ricky Proehl. They were recognized as one of the greatest offenses to play in NFL history. (Note: The first team referred to as "The Greatest Show on Turf" was the 1992 Houston Oilers, the title of their 1993 NFL Films highlight film. The Oilers employed the wide-open run-and-shoot offense.)
 Gritz Blitz: Nickname for the 1977 Atlanta Falcons defense led by then defensive assistant Jerry Glanville that allowed the fewest points per game (9.2) in NFL history.
 Ground Chuck: Nickname for the conservative, ball-control offense favored by coach Chuck Knox.
The Iggles: Nickname for the Philadelphia Eagles.
 Homeland Defense: Nickname for the New England Patriots defense during their runs to Super Bowl XXXVIII and XXXIX.
The Hogs: The Washington Redskins' offensive line in the 1980s. They were considered one of the largest and strongest offensive lines in football history, originally consisting of Joe Jacoby, Russ Grimm, Mark May, George Starke, and Jeff Bostic.
 Jackson 5: Nickname of the 2017 Jacksonville Jaguars secondary coming from the famous music group
 Jeff Stoutland University: Philadelphia Eagles 2022 offensive line. Coined by Jordan Mailata.
Kardiac Kids: The 1980 Cleveland Browns offensive unit featuring Brian Sipe, Greg Pruitt, Ozzie Newsome, Dave Logan, and Reggie Rucker who had a penchant for having games decided in the final moments.
 The Killer Bees: The 1982 Miami Dolphins defensive team; six of their 11 starters had last names that began with the letter "B" (Bob Baumhower, Bill Barnett, Lyle Blackwood, Kim Bokamper, Glenn Blackwood, Charles Bowser, Doug Betters, and Bob Brudzinski).  They allowed only 131 points in the strike-shortened, nine-game regular season.
The Killer B's: Three members of the Pittsburgh Steelers, consisting of Ben Roethlisberger, Le'Veon Bell, Antonio Brown, and sometimes Chris Boswell. Name was first used during the 2016 NFL season.
Legion of Boom: The dominant secondary of the Seattle Seahawks, consisting of All-Pro safety tandem Earl Thomas and Kam Chancellor as well as the league's largest set of corners in 6′4″ Pro Bowler Brandon Browner and 6′3″ All-Pro Richard Sherman. The term has come to encompass the entire defense.
Legion of Vroom: Cleveland Browns wide receiver corps of Odell Beckham Jr., Jarvis Landry, Rashard Higgins, David Njoku and Donovan Peoples-Jones.
Legion of Zoom: The unstoppable wide receiver corps of the Kansas City Chiefs, particularly known for their speed, consisting of Tyreek Hill, Sammy Watkins, Demarcus Robinson, and Mecole Hardman and notably TE Travis Kelce, starting in 2018 with the arrival of a top quarterback, Patrick Mahomes
Marty Ball: Coach Marty Schottenheimer's football strategy.
 Miami Pound Machine The nickname of the late 1980s and early '90s Dolphins defense coming from the band that Gloria Estefan started the Miami Sound Machine
 No Fly Zone: Self-named defense for the 2015 Denver Broncos. It refers to the team's All-Pro Secondary that included Chris Harris Jr. and Aqib Talib, combined with a top of the league pass rush led by Super Bowl 50 MVP Von Miller. Wade Phillips 3-4 defense led the league in most defensive categories and was wisely considered the best of the NFL.
Million Dollar Backfield was given to two historical backfields. It was first used to refer to the backfield of the then–Chicago Cardinals in 1947 after owner Charles Bidwill spent an unprecedented amount of money to lure several of the era's top players to the team. The term was resurrected again in 1954 for the backfield of the San Francisco 49ers, which would go on to produce four Hall of Famers.
Monsters of the Midway: Originally applied to the Chicago Bears of the early 1940s, but revived for the 1980s Bears and subsequent successful Bears defensive teams. Originally used for the University of Chicago Maroons college football team. "Midway" was the name of the park on campus.
New Jack City: The New York Jets secondary in the late 2010s and the early 2020s, led by both Jamal Adams and Marcus Maye. It was based on the movie New Jack City which is about robberies in New York City. 
New York Sack Exchange: The New York Jets defense of the early 1980s, led by defensive end Mark Gastineau along with Joe Klecko, and interior linemen Marty Lyons and Abdul Salaam. Fans began showing up at Shea Stadium with "NY Sack Exchange" signs, then the team itself began to promote that moniker. Name references the New York Stock Exchange on New York's Wall Street.
 No-Name Defense: The 1970s Miami Dolphins defensive team, especially that of its undefeated 1972 season, which performed excellently despite a lack of recognizable stars.  They earned their nickname the previous year when Dallas coach Tom Landry said in an interview prior to Super Bowl VI that he could not remember the names of the Miami defensive players.
Orange Crush: The 1970s Denver Broncos defensive team, led by defensive end Lyle Alzado and linebackers Randy Gradishar and Tom Jackson.
Over-the-Hill Gang: The George Allen–coached Washington Redskins of the early 1970s, so named because of the large number of veteran players on the team.  Many of those players also played for Allen when he coached the Los Angeles Rams from 1966–1970.
 Patsies: Poorly performing New England Patriots squads, a play on the nickname "The Pats".
The Posse 1991 Washington Redskins Wide Receiving corps featuring Art Monk, Gary Clark, and Ricky Sanders.
 Purple Pain: This Baltimore Ravens nickname stems from the team's color, purple. It is also an allusion to the movie and song "Purple Rain".
Purple People Eaters: The 1970s Minnesota Vikings defensive line, specifically the combination of Alan Page, Jim Marshall, Carl Eller, and Gary Larsen. The name is a reference to both the purple uniforms of the Vikings and the 1958 Sheb Wooley song "Purple People Eater."
 Purple Murder: The Baltimore Ravens' color is purple. A group of crows is called a "murder of crows", and Ravens are similar to crows. Technically, a group of Ravens is referred to as an "unkindness of ravens". Purple Unkindness is a less catchy nickname. In addition, Ray Lewis, a longtime member of the Ravens, was implicated in a murder case during his playing career, possibly popularizing the phrase.
The Redwood Forest: The nickname given to the Kansas City Chiefs triple stack defense of the late 1960s and early 1970s that carried them to a title in Super Bowl IV
Sack Nation: The nickname for the Kansas City Chiefs defense beginning in the early 2010's, currently led by Chris Jones
 Sack Pack: The defensive line of the Baltimore Colts in the mid-to-late 1970s. The Sack Pack were defensive tackles Joe Ehrmann (#76) and Mike Barnes (#63) and defensive ends Fred Cook (#72) and John Dutton (#78). In 1975, the Sack Pack established itself with 59 sacks. It had 56 the following year and 47 in 1977 before slowing down due to injuries.
Sacksonville: A portmanteau of the word sack and the city of Jacksonville. "Sacksonville" is used to refer to the Jacksonville Jaguars defense during the 2017 season, which was known to cause a high number of sacks, interceptions, and turnovers.
San Diego Super Chargers: Nickname given to the San Diego Chargers from its fight song.
Silver Rush: Nickname given to the Detroit Lions defensive line during the early 1980s, led by Bubba Baker and Doug English
The Smurfs: The early to mid 1980's Washington Redskins' receiving corps was called this because of their diminutive size. The original smurfs were starters Alvin Garrett who was 5′7″ and "Downtown" Charlie Brown who was 5′10″. The nickname came from comparing them to the tiny blue comic and cartoon characters.
Steel Curtain: Nickname given to the defensive line of the 1970s Pittsburgh Steelers, the backbone of a dominant defense.  The nickname was a play on the phrase Iron Curtain during the height of the Cold War.
 Sons of Anarchy: The New York Jets defensive line of the early 2010s consisting of Muhammad Wilkerson, Damon Harrison, and Sheldon Richardson. Alludes to the FX television series of the same name which was highly popular at the time.
The Succs/Yuccs: Derogatory nickname given to the Tampa Bay Buccaneers due to their reputation as a perennial losing team 
 SWAT team: Name of the Cincinnati Bengals' secondary of David Fulcher, Solomon Wilcots, Eric Thomas, and Lewis Billups coached by Defensive Coordinator Dick LeBeau during the 1988 season.
 The Three Amigos: Denver Broncos wide receivers Mark Jackson, Vance Johnson, and Ricky Nattiel. The nickname came from the 1986 movie, "The Three Amigos".
 The Triplets: Troy Aikman, Michael Irvin and Emmitt Smith, the offensive stars of the 1990s Dallas Cowboys three-time Super Bowl winning teams
 YAC Bros: Nickname for the 2020s 49ers offense, consisting of offensive stars Christian McCaffrey, Deebo Samuel, Brandon Aiyuk, and George Kittle

People
Nicknames for individual players, coaches and personnel.

Places
The Big Crabcake given to M&T Bank Stadium by announcers for the Baltimore, Maryland area being known for its love of seafood, particularly Maryland crabs and crab cakes.
 Big Sombrero: Nickname given to Tampa Stadium, first home of the Tampa Bay Buccaneers, so named because of its curved outline that resembled the brim of a sombrero. Raymond James Stadium, the Buccaneers' home since 1998, was christened The New Sombrero by ESPN anchor Chris Berman.
 Black Hole: Name of the section behind the south end zone at Oakland Coliseum, former home of the Las Vegas Raiders, known for having some of the most rabid fans in the NFL. No equivalent exists in Las Vegas's Allegiant Stadium since it eventually opened to the public.
 The Clink: Nickname formerly given to Lumen Field, home of the Seattle Seahawks. The nickname was a shortening of the Stadium's previous name, "CenturyLink Field", which was changed after the company rebranded to Lumen Technologies in 2020.
 City of Brotherly Hate: Nickname given by NFL.com to fans of the Philadelphia Eagles, particularly after the team's underperformance during the 2011 season, for the fanbase's notorious discontent. The name is a play on the "city of brotherly love", the English translation of the city of Philadelphia's (Greek) name.
Dawg Pound: Name of the bleacher section behind the east end zone in FirstEnergy Stadium, also known for having one of the most loyal fans in the NFL. The name was originally applied to the same section of Cleveland Municipal Stadium, which formerly stood on the site.
 The Death Star: Nickname for Allegiant Stadium, the home stadium for the Las Vegas Raiders, in Paradise, Nevada due to its resemblance to the fictional space station from Star Wars.
 The Factory of Sadness: FirstEnergy Stadium, home of the Cleveland Browns. Coined in a YouTube video by comedian Mike Polk Jr. after a Browns loss in 2011. The nickname is additionally used as the name of a Browns fan site
 Frozen Tundra (of Lambeau Field): Nickname given to the home field of the Green Bay Packers. The phrase was allegedly first uttered by NFL Films narrator John Facenda as he described the 1967 NFL Championship Game, or "Ice Bowl", during which Lambeau's undersoil heating system failed and the field froze. However, Steve Sabol of NFL Films denies that Facenda used the phrase; it is thought that an impersonation of Facenda by Chris Berman popularized the phrase. Without a heating system, the severe winter climate of Green Bay, Wisconsin would frequently cause the field to freeze. 
 House of Pain: the Houston Astrodome during NFL games played by the Houston Oilers. This was during the days that Warren Moon was the quarterback, and the Oilers defense was a force to be reckoned with, particularly during the Jerry Glanville years.
JerryWorld: AT&T Stadium, named after Dallas Cowboys owner Jerry Jones. See stadium's article for full list of current nicknames.
The Jungle: The nickname for the Bengals' stadium. The name largely derived in the 1980s from the Guns N' Roses' song "Welcome to the Jungle". The "Jungle" name has since applied other teams' stadiums with similar mascots.
The Linc: Nickname for Lincoln Financial Field in Philadelphia.
The Outdoor Insane Asylum: Nickname for Baltimore's Memorial Stadium.
 The Q: A nickname for Qualcomm Stadium, the old home of the San Diego (now Los Angeles) Chargers. The stadium was also nicknamed "The Murph" after its original name of Jack Murphy Stadium.
 The Ralph: Shortened nickname of Ralph Wilson Stadium, home of the Buffalo Bills (now called Highmark Stadium). The stadium was aptly named after Bills founder Ralph Wilson. 
 Razor: New England Patriots stadium Gillette Stadium.
 Rockpile: The seating section underneath the scoreboard at Highmark Stadium.  Considered one of the most raucous environments in the NFL, this section was named after War Memorial Stadium (the home of the Bills prior to Highmark Stadium) which was referred to locally as "The Rockpile" for its decrepitude by the time the Bills began playing there (and led to it being replaced with what is now Highmark Stadium).
 The Roomba: Allegiant Stadium, so nicknamed because of its resemblance to a Roomba automated vacuum cleaner.
 The Swamp: Giants Stadium's nickname in East Rutherford, New Jersey.
 The 'Stick: Common nickname for Candlestick Park in San Francisco.
Home of the Faithful: Nickname for the 49ers new Levi's Stadium in Santa Clara. 
700 Level: The notorious upper levels of the former Veterans Stadium in Philadelphia between 1971 and 2002.  This section was infamous for brawls between Philadelphia Eagles fans and those of visiting teams, especially Dallas Cowboys fans.
 Titletown: Referring to both the city of Green Bay, Wisconsin and the 13-time NFL champion Packers teams, including those of legendary coaches Vince Lombardi and Curly Lambeau.
 The Vault: Bank of America Stadium in Charlotte, North Carolina. Home of the Carolina Panthers.
 The Vet: Veterans Stadium in Philadelphia, Pennsylvania. Home of the Philadelphia Eagles from 1971-2002. Demolished in March 2004.

Fans
The 12th Man/The 12's: Nickname given to the fans of the Seattle Seahawks because of the impact of their loud cheering on the opposing team's offensive linemen, leading to false start penalties. Since 1990, the Seahawks have had to pay licensing fees to Texas A&M University at College Station, because of the college filing a trademark on the phrase that year. Used to a lesser extent by the Buffalo Bills, also under license.
 4th Phase: Fans of the Chicago Bears. Infers the fans are the 4th phase of the game, after Offense, Defense and Special Teams.
 Big Easy Mafia: (Motivated Authentic Fans In Alliance) is a premier New Orleans Saints fan club established in 2013. They hold massive tailgate parties before every home game in front of the Superdome, and also meet up in numbers at a local venue for the away games. The popular costume wearing "Saints Superfans" are also a big part of this club, participating in charity events and fundraisers in and around New Orleans. 
 Bills Mafia: A term for the broad community of Buffalo Bills fans, players, coaches and alumni. Prior to the 2010s, Bills fans were officially known as Bills Backers. "Bills Mafia" originated among a group of Bills fans on Twitter circa 2010 and grew in popularity over the decade.
 Bills Elvis: Entertainer and Elvis impersonator John R. Lang, who appears with a large white guitar that he uses as a billboard. He is one of the Bills' most recognizable individual fans and appears regularly in NFL Films productions.
 Black Hole: Las Vegas Raiders fans who formerly sat in a section of the Oakland Coliseum known as the 'black hole' (sections 104, 105, 106, and 107) which is mostly occupied by rowdy fans when the team played in Oakland.
 Boo Birds: Philadelphia Eagles Though used by other teams as well, largely refers to Philadelphia Eagles fans who are known for their tendency to boo for almost any reason and especially at their own team when the Eagles are performing poorly.
 Browns Backers: The fan club for the Cleveland Browns that has over 100,000 members
Cheeseheads: A name given to people of Wisconsin (mainly Green Bay Packers fans) by Chicago Bears fans after the Bears won the Super Bowl. The name mocks Wisconsin's love of cheese.  The name eventually gained acceptance.
Chiefs Kingdom:  Fans of the Kansas City Chiefs.
Chief Zee: Fan who attended nearly all Washington Redskins games from 1978 to 2016 and was considered the unofficial mascot of the team.  He wore an Indian headdress, large rimmed glasses, with a red jacket and carried a tomahawk.
Fireman Ed: Fan at NY Jets home games who wore a green fireman helmet with a Jets logo on the front.  Known for leading the "J-E-T-S" chants. He retired the "Fireman Ed" character immediately after the infamous Butt Fumble game, although he still attends games.
 Flameheads: Fans of the Tennessee Titans wear hats made to look like flames. In Greek Mythology, fire was invented by Prometheus, who was a Titan.
 Franco's Italian Army: Fans of Pittsburgh Steelers running back Franco Harris.
 Gerela's Gorillas: Fans of Pittsburgh Steelers placekicker Roy Gerela.
Hogettes: A group of about twelve Washington Redskins fans who dress in drag and wear pig-noses.  The name is a takeoff of the Redskins' "Hogs" offensive line.
License Plate Guy: Nickname given to New York Giants fan Joe Ruback, best known for the Giants-themed license plates he wears at each game and his presence at most Giants games in general.
Mob Squad: Referring to fans of The Los Angeles Rams from their final years in St. Louis until 2016; extending to their current tenure back in Los Angeles.
Never Miss a Super Bowl Club: An exclusive group, who have attended every Super Bowl game to date.
 Niner Empire: Fans of the San Francisco 49ers. Due to the 49ers Super Bowl dynasty of the 1980s and part way into the 1990s.
  49er Faithful: Faithful fans of the 49ers no matter how they perform. 
 Packer Backer: Fan of the Green Bay Packers. Sometimes used derisively by Bears fans.
Pancho Billa: Ezra Castro (1979–2019), a Texas-based Buffalo Bills superfan with a trademark lucha mask whose unsuccessful fight against cancer earned him fame and an appearance at the 2018 NFL Draft.
Pinto Ron: Ken Johnson, a well-known fan of the Buffalo Bills known for appearing at all the Bills' home and away games, his bushy beard, his tailgating on a 1980 Ford Pinto (hence his name), and the infamous practice of serving shots of liquor out of a bowling ball, a practice that the league has since banned.
 Ravens Flock: Fans of the Baltimore Ravens.
Raider Nation: Las Vegas Raiders fans. The first team in the NFL to be characterized as a "nation". The rest of the teams quickly adopted the title and therefore coined a variety of various team "nations".
Steeler Nation: Fans of the Pittsburgh Steelers.
 SuperSkin: Die-hard Superfan of the Washington Redskins, who has attended each home game at FedEx Field since 1999 dressed in a burgundy and gold superhero costume while motivating other fans to cheer loudly.
The Jungle: Nickname given to fans of the Cincinnati Bengals.
 The Sea of Red: Nickname given to the loudest NFL fans of the Kansas City Chiefs at Arrowhead Stadium.
Who Dat Nation: New Orleans Saints fans.

Rules named after NFL figures
Throughout the league's history, a number of rules have been enacted largely because of exploits on the field by a single coach, owner, player, or referee.  The following is a partial list of such rule changes:
Baugh/Marshall rule: A forward pass that struck the goal posts was automatically ruled incomplete. The safety was a deciding factor as the Rams won 15–14. Marshall was so mad at the outcome that he was a major force in passing this rule change. (The rule is now mostly obsolete as the goal posts are now on the end lines and thus out of the field of play.)
Bert Emanuel rule: The ball can touch the ground during a completed pass as long as the receiver maintains control of the ball. Enacted in 2000 due to a play in the 1999 NFC championship game, where Emanuel, playing for the Tampa Bay Buccaneers, had a catch ruled incomplete since the ball touched the ground.
Bill Belichick rule: Two defensive players, one primary and one backup, will have a radio device in their helmets allowing the head coach to communicate with them through the radio headset, identical to the radio device inside the helmet of the quarterback. This proposal was defeated in previous years, but was finally enacted in 2008 as a result of Spygate.
Brian Bosworth rule: Linebackers are allowed to wear jersey numbers between 40 and 49. Named for Bosworth, who unsuccessfully sued the NFL, and had himself listed as a safety, to be allowed to wear the number 44 as a linebacker, the rule was passed long after Bosworth's retirement.
Bronko Nagurski rule: Enacted in 1933, forward passing became legal from anywhere behind the line of scrimmage. Enacted in response to a controversial call in the 1932 NFL Playoff Game, in which Nagurski completed a two-yard pass to Red Grange for the Chicago Bears' winning touchdown. The rule at the time mandated that a forward pass had to be thrown from at least five yards behind the line of scrimmage. Nagurski appeared to have not dropped back five yards before passing to Grange, but the touchdown stood.
Calvin Johnson rule: A receiver must maintain possession of the football throughout the completion of the play. This was more precisely a clarification of the existing rules regarding catches, made in 2010 in response to a play by Calvin Johnson, who made a falling catch in the end zone, and placed the ball on the ground soon after he hit the ground and before standing up. This was ruled incomplete upon review, and upheld, though it generated discussion about what constituted a catch.
Carson Palmer rule: A rushing defensive player won't be allowed to forcibly hit a quarterback below the knees, unless they are blocked into. Enacted in the 2006 NFL season after Bengals quarterback Carson Palmer was injured in the 2005 AFC Wild Card game after he was hit below by Steelers defender Kimo von Oelhoffen, as well as similar injuries to the Steelers' Ben Roethlisberger and the Bucs' Brian Griese.
Dave Casper rule: See the "Ken Stabler" rule.
Deacon Jones rule: No head-slapping. Enacted in 1977 in response to the defensive end's frequently used technique against opponents.
Deion Sanders rule: Player salary rule which correlates a contract's signing bonus with its yearly salary. Enacted after Sanders signed with the Dallas Cowboys in 1995 for a minimum salary and a $13 million signing bonus. (There is also a college football rule with this nickname.)
Ed Hochuli rule: Instant replay can be used to determine whether a loose ball from a passer is definitely a fumble or an incomplete pass. This was enacted in 2009 in response to a play in the San Diego Chargers – Denver Broncos Week 2 regular season game where, in the final minutes, referee Ed Hochuli ruled that Broncos quarterback Jay Cutler threw an incomplete pass. Replays clearly showed it was a fumble, but the play was previously not reviewable.
Emmitt Smith rule: A player cannot remove his helmet while on the field of play, except in the case of obvious medical difficulty. A violation is treated as unsportsmanlike conduct. Enacted in 1997. The Dallas Cowboys running back was the most high-profile player who celebrated in this manner immediately after scoring a touchdown.
Fran Tarkenton rule: A line judge was added as the sixth official to ensure that a back was indeed behind the line of scrimmage before throwing a forward pass. Enacted in 1965 in response to Tarkenton, who frequently scrambled around in the backfield from one side to the other.
Greg Pruitt rule: Tear-away jerseys became illegal starting in 1979. Pruitt purposely wore flimsy jerseys that ripped apart in the hands of would-be tacklers. Such a jersey was most infamously seen in a 1978 game between the Rams and Oilers in which Earl Campbell's jersey ripped apart after several missed tackles.
Hines Ward rule: The blocking rule makes illegal a blindside block if it comes from the blocker's helmet, forearm or shoulder and lands to the head or neck area of the defender. Enacted in 2009 after the Pittsburgh Steelers receiver broke Cincinnati linebacker Keith Rivers's jaw while making such a block during the previous season.
Jerome Bettis rule: Enacted in 1999, the rule states all calls for coin flips will occur before the referee tosses the coin in the air, and at least two officials will be present during the coin toss.  This is in response to a call considered one of the "worst in history." In a Thanksgiving Day game with the Detroit Lions on November 26, 1998, Bettis was sent out as the Steelers' representative for the overtime coin toss. Bettis appeared to call "tails" while the coin was in the air but referee Phil Luckett declared that Bettis called "heads" and awarded possession to Detroit, who would go on to win the game before Pittsburgh had the chance to have possession. 
Jim Schwartz rule: Modifying the "no-challenge" rule adopted prior to the  season to eliminate the automatic "no-review" penalty when a coach challenges a play that is subject to automatic review by the replay booth (turnovers, scoring plays, and any play inside of the two-minute warning). This change was prompted after the 2012 Thanksgiving Day game when Detroit Lions' head coach Jim Schwartz threw a challenge flag on a play where replay clearly showed Houston Texans' running back Justin Forsett's knee touched the ground, but was able to get up and score a touchdown. Due to the way the rule was written at the time the penalty for the errant challenge prevented the play from being reviewed. Under the revised rule teams will be charged a time-out (or an unsportsmanlike conduct penalty if the team is out of time-outs) when a coach throws a challenge flag on a booth-reviewable play, but the play will still be reviewed if the replay booth believes a review is necessary.
Jimmy Graham rule: Effective the 2014 NFL season, the action of "dunking" the football through the goal post/crossbar as a prop in touchdown celebrations is now considered an unsportsmanlike conduct penalty (15 yards).  This rule was in response to Graham's tendency to dunk the football after scores while playing for the New Orleans Saints. One of his dunks during the Saints' 2013 Week 12 Thursday Night Football game against the Atlanta Falcons bent the goal posts so much that the game was delayed several minutes in order for the stadium crew to make adjustments. Additionally, the league extended the height of the goal posts from 30 to 35 feet, adding extra weight and therefore increasing the chances that it could collapse.
Justin Tucker rule: First named during the controversial Sunday Night Football game between the Baltimore Ravens and New England Patriots in Week 3 of the 2012 season (one of the most memorable games that took place during the 2012 NFL referee lockout), commonly referred to simply as the "Tucker Rule," and named after Baltimore kicker Justin Tucker, this rule states that if the ball is kicked directly over one of the posts during a field goal attempt, then the field goal is deemed good. This is, indeed, what happened during the game, as Tucker made a successful kick like this on the final play of the game.
Ken Stabler rule: On fourth down at any time in the game or any down in the final two minutes of a half, if a player fumbles forward, only the fumbling player can recover and/or advance the ball. If that player's teammate recovers the ball, it is placed back at the spot of the fumble. A defensive player can recover and advance at any time of play. Enacted in 1979 in response to the 1978 "Holy Roller" play that resulted in a last-minute game-winning touchdown over San Diego, in which Oakland Raiders quarterback Stabler fumbled the ball forward, and tight end Dave Casper eventually performed a soccer-like dribble before falling on it in the end zone.
Lester Hayes rule: No Stickum allowed. Enacted in 1981 in response to the Oakland Raiders defensive back, who used the sticky substance to improve his grip.
Lou Groza rule: No artificial medium to assist in the execution of a kick. Enacted in 1956 in response to Groza, who used tape and later a special tee with a long tail to help him guide his foot to the center spot of the football.
Mel Blount rule: Officially known as illegal contact downfield, defensive backs can only make contact with receivers within five yards of the line of scrimmage. Enacted in its current form in 1978. While playing for the Pittsburgh Steelers, defensive back Blount frequently used physical play against receivers he was covering.
Mel Renfro rule: Allows a second player on the offense to catch a tipped ball, without a defender subsequently touching it. Enacted in 1978. One of the first high-profile "victims" of the old rule was Dallas Cowboys defensive back Renfro in Super Bowl V; his tip of a pass allowed the Baltimore Colts' John Mackey to legally catch the ball and run in for a 75-yard touchdown.
NaVorro Bowman rule: Enacted in 2014, this rule subjects plays in which a loose ball has been recovered to instant replay. Named for Bowman, who during an incident in the previous season's NFC Championship Game recovered a fumble after the officials had blown the play dead.
Neil Smith rule: Prevents a defensive lineman from flinching to induce a false start penalty on the offense.  Enacted in 1998. Smith had frequently used that technique while playing for both the Kansas City Chiefs and the Denver Broncos.
Odell Beckham Jr. rule: Any player who accumulates two unsportsmanlike conduct penalties in a game is automatically ejected. The original draft of the proposed rule would have counted any two personal fouls toward ejection and drew its name from Beckham, who committed three personal fouls during a game in the 2015 season. The rule, as enacted for 2016, would not have applied to Beckham.
Phil Dawson rule: Certain field goals can be reviewed by instant replay, including kicks that bounce off the uprights. Under the previous system, no field goals could be replayed. Enacted in 2008 in response to an unusual field goal by the Cleveland Browns kicker in a 2007 game against Baltimore: the ball hit the left upright, then hit the rear curved post (stanchion), then carried again over the crossbar, and landed in the end zone in front of the goalpost. It was initially ruled by the officials as "no good", but was reversed "upon discussion".
Red Grange rule: Prohibits college football players from signing with NFL teams until after their college class had graduated and from playing both college football and in the NFL in the same season. The rule was enacted after Red Grange and Ernie Nevers joined the Chicago Bears and Duluth Eskimos, respectively, immediately after their final college football games in 1925.
Ricky (Williams) rule: Rule declared that hair could not be used to block part of the uniform from a tackler and, therefore, an opposing player could be tackled by his hair. Enacted in 2003. Rule was so-named after running back Williams' long dread-locks.
(Dan) Rooney Rule: Requires teams to interview minority candidates for a head coaching opportunity.  Enacted in 2003. Pittsburgh Steelers owner Rooney was a major proponent of such a change.
Roy Williams rule: No horse-collar tackles. Enacted in 2005 after the Dallas Cowboys safety broke Terrell Owens's ankle and Musa Smith's leg on horse-collar tackles during the previous season.
(Paul) Salata rule: A team is not allowed to pass on a draft pick at the end of the draft in an effort to secure the last pick. Named after Paul Salata, who many years after his playing career established the Mr. Irrelevant ceremony; it became so popular that in the 1979 NFL Draft, the two teams with the last selections repeatedly passed to each other hoping the other would pick and they would get the Mr. Irrelevant publicity, necessitating the rule change.
Shawne Merriman rule: Bans any player from playing in the Pro Bowl if he tests positive for using a performance-enhancing drug during that season. Enacted in 2007 after the San Diego Chargers linebacker played at the 2007 Pro Bowl after testing positive and serving a four-game suspension during the preceding season.
Steelers rule: The details have yet to be finalized, but the NFL has announced that in coming seasons, not just players, but teams could face fines if a series of illegal hits is seen from any particular organization.  The rule has been met with significant criticisms, understandably from the Steelers organization, and from others that fear the new rules will dampen the spirit of the game and make professional football "too soft".
Steve Tasker rule: On punt returns, gunners receive a 15-yard unsportsmanlike conduct penalty for deliberately running out of bounds to avoid blocks, a tactic frequently used by Tasker before the rule was implemented.
Tom Brady rule: A clarification to the Carson Palmer rule; prohibits a defender on the ground from lunging or diving at a quarterback's legs unless that defender has been blocked or fouled into the signal-caller. Enacted in 2009 in response to a play by Kansas City Chiefs safety Bernard Pollard, who on the ground sacked Brady and injured the Patriots quarterback's MCL and ACL, sidelining him for the rest of the 2008 season.
Tom Dempsey rule: Any shoe that is worn by a player with an artificial limb on his kicking leg must have a kicking surface that conforms to that of a normal kicking shoe. Enacted in 1977. Dempsey, who was born without toes on his right foot and no fingers on his right hand, wore a modified shoe with a flattened and enlarged toe surface, generating controversy about whether such a shoe gave him an unfair advantage kicking field goals. Dempsey's game-winning 63-yard field goal in  set the record for longest field goal, though the record was later broken.
Ty Law rule (also known as the Rodney Harrison rule): Enacted in 2004, placed more emphasis on the Mel Blount rule. Enacted after Law, Harrison, and the rest of the New England Patriots defense utilized an aggressive coverage scheme, involving excessive jamming of wide receivers at the line of scrimmage, in the 2003 AFC championship game against the Indianapolis Colts.

Other

Bird gauntlet: The five teams that use a bird-based team name and mascot (Arizona Cardinals, Atlanta Falcons, Baltimore Ravens, Philadelphia Eagles and Seattle Seahawks). In order to run the bird gauntlet, a team must be scheduled to face all five teams (which, given that four of the five teams are in the NFC, effectively requires a team be in that conference) and defeat them all, which has never occurred. Since the Ravens joined the gauntlet in 1996, no team has successfully run the bird gauntlet; the most recent to fail was the 2022 New Orleans Saints.
Boise Rule: A rule instituted by the NFL in 2011 banning non-green playing surfaces. "Boise" refers to Albertsons Stadium (then known as Bronco Stadium), the home field of Boise State University, famous for its blue playing surface. The rule was viewed as a reaction to potential sponsor influence, as no NFL team had considered adopting a non-green surface.
The Duke: A nickname for the late Wellington Mara, longtime owner of the New York Giants.  The nickname stems from the Duke of Wellington, an actual English hereditary title.  This nickname was extended to the official game ball used by the NFL "The Duke" named in honor of Mr. Mara.  To this day one can notice the moniker "THE DUKE." branded into every official NFL football just to the left of the NFL Shield. (In Denver, the same nickname was given to quarterback John Elway, after a teammate noticed that his walk to the huddle before The Drive in 1987 looked like John Wayne's.)
Harbaugh Bowl: Rare games when brothers John and Jim Harbaugh, both NFL head coaches, met as opponents, which included Super Bowl XLVII, the first Super Bowl in which brothers were opposing coaches. The games have also been given nicknames like the "HarBowl".
Ickey Shuffle: Dance done by Cincinnati Bengals running back Ickey Woods whenever he scored a touchdown. Woods was forced to move the dance to the sidelines behind the Bengals' bench after officials starting penalizing him for unsportsmanlike conduct.
K-Gun: Nickname referring to the no-huddle offense used by the Buffalo Bills with quarterback Jim Kelly during the late 1980s and early to mid-1990s.  The K in K-Gun comes from "Killer", the nickname given to Kelly's teammate Keith McKeller.
Lambeau Leap: During home games at Lambeau Field, some players from the Green Bay Packers would leap into the stands after scoring a touchdown. Originally created by LeRoy Butler, it was made popular by Robert Brooks. Players in other stadiums imitate the leap.
Manning Bowl: Rare games when quarterback brothers Peyton (formerly of the Indianapolis Colts and Denver Broncos) and Eli Manning (New York Giants) met as opponents.
Mile High Salute: A touchdown celebration used by Denver Broncos running back Terrell Davis during his playing career, in which he would salute his fellow teammates (and sometimes the fans). A simplified variant (including only the salute portion) has been used by Broncos players ever since.
No Fun League: Used by various reports criticizing the league for its sanctions imposed on teams. Popularized by the XFL.
 Red Gun: The offense of Jerry Glanville when he was with the Atlanta Falcons
Sack Dance: New York Jets defensive end Mark Gastineau was nationally famous for doing his signature "Sack Dance" after sacking an opposing quarterback. However, he had to stop when the NFL declared it "unsportsmanlike taunting" in March 1984 and began fining players for it.
Snoopy Bowl: Annual preseason game (week 3) between the New York Giants and the New York Jets. The name was coined in 2010 when New Meadowlands Stadium was renamed to MetLife Stadium (at the time Snoopy was the mascot for the company).
Tebowing: A pose imitating Tim Tebow's stance when praying.
Terrible Towel: a banner conceived by the late Myron Cope (long time Steeler commentator) used by fans of the Pittsburgh Steelers to cheer for their team, consisting of a yellow towel with the words "Terrible Towel" in black, to be waved in the air. The Carolina Panthers also began a spin-off known as the "Growl Towel".  Also spoofed by the Packers following their third Super Bowl victory as the "Title Towel". Similar traditions have also started in other sports, as Towel Power used by the Vancouver Canucks of the National Hockey League and the Homer Hanky used by Major League Baseball's Minnesota Twins.

See also
 Tuesday Morning Quarterback#"TMQ" team nicknames
 Lists of nicknames – nickname list articles on Wikipedia
 Football Nicknames: Over 7,400 Listed by Terry Pruyne
 List of athletes by nickname
 List of nicknames in basketball
 List of baseball nicknames

References

External links
 Sports Nicknames: 20,000 Professionals Worldwide by Terry W. Pruyne
 Football Nicknames: Over 7,400 Listed

Nic
NFL